An incomplete list of the earliest films produced in Japan ordered by year between the 1898 and 1909. For an A-Z of films see :Category:Japanese films.

1898-1909

References

External links
 Japanese film at the Internet Movie Database

1890s
Lists of 1890s films
Lists of 1900s films
Films
Films